The Lockheed Martin FB-22 was a proposed stealth bomber aircraft marketed to the United States Air Force. Its design was derived from the F-22 Raptor. Lockheed Martin proposed its unsolicited design as a "regional bomber" to complement the aging U.S. strategic bomber fleet. Lockheed Martin appeared to suspend work on the concept following the 2006 Quadrennial Defense Review, which called for a new strategic bomber by 2018.

Design and development
In 2001, Lockheed Martin began studies on the feasibility of the FB-22 as the company sought to leverage the design and capabilities of the F-22 Raptor. Experience gleaned from Operation Enduring Freedom in Afghanistan demonstrated the value of a bomber that could remain in theatre in the absence of surface-to-air missiles. The F-22, while designed as an air superiority fighter, embodied some degree of air-to-ground attack ability.

One primary objective of the internal studies was to exploit the F-22's air-to-ground capability while keeping costs to a minimum. To this end, the company devised several concepts that saw significant structural redesigns with respect to the fuselage and wings, while retaining much of the F-22's avionics. With an early design, Lockheed Martin lengthened and widened the fuselage to increase the internal weapons load; it was later found that doing so would have incurred a cost penalty of 25–30% in weight, materials and development. Instead, the company left the fuselage intact as it enlarged the wing to a more delta shape. The wing, which was around three times that of the F-22, enabled the storage of a much larger amount of weapons and fuel. Various figures give the payload of the FB-22 to be 30 to 35 Small Diameter Bombs; this is compared to the F-22's payload of eight of such  weapons. With stealth, the aircraft's maximum combat load was to have been ; without stealth, .

This placed the aircraft in the category of a regional bomber, comparable to that of the F-111, as it was intended to replace the F-15E Strike Eagle and take over some of the missions of the B-1 and B-2. According to Air Force Magazine, the combination of range and payload of the FB-22 would have given the concept a comparable effectiveness to that of the B-2 armed with  bombs. The design could also have been adapted to use a more powerful engine, such as the F-35 Lightning II's Pratt & Whitney F135, or the General Electric/Rolls-Royce F136. While an early FB-22 concept featured no tailplanes, the design incorporated twin tailplanes and likely would have fixed engine nozzles as opposed to the thrust vectoring nozzles on the F-22. The FB-22 was to have a maximum speed of Mach 1.92. Because the aircraft was to emphasize air-to-ground capability while maintaining stealth characteristics, the FB-22 would have lacked dogfighting capability.

One aspect that arose during the early stages of the design process was the consideration that Boeing would be responsible for the final assembly of the aircraft. At the time, Lockheed Martin was making the mid-fuselage at its plant in Fort Worth, Texas, while assembling the F-22 in Marietta, Georgia. However, since Boeing was responsible for the manufacturing of parts of the fuselage and more crucially, the wings—as well as integrating the avionics—it was considered prudent to give final assembly to Boeing.

Other than the wings, the aircraft would have retained much of the design of the F-22. This included 80% of the avionics, software, and flight controls. This commonality would have also significantly reduced the costs of software integration.

In February 2003, during a session with the House Committee on Armed Services, Air Force Secretary James Roche said that he envisioned a force of 150 FB-22s would equip the service. In 2004, Lockheed Martin officially presented the FB-22 to the Air Force to meet its requirement for a potential strategic bomber as an interim solution to become operational by 2018. Because of the work already done on the F-22, the cost of developing the FB-22 was estimated to be as low as 25% of developing a new bomber, with development expected to be US$5–7 billion (2002 dollars), including the airframe cost of US$1 billion (2003 dollars). It was later revealed that six different versions of the bomber were submitted, as targets, payload and range had yet to be defined. In addition, as a stealth bomber, the FB-22 was designed to carry weapons externally while maintaining stealth with the assistance of detachable and faceted pods dubbed "wing weapons bay"; previously, an aircraft could only remain stealthy if it carried its weapons internally. However, the FB-22 in its planned form appears to have been canceled in the wake of the 2006 Quadrennial Defense Review and subsequent developments as the Department of Defense favored a bomber with much greater range.

Specifications (proposed)

See also

References

 Miller, Jay. Lockheed Martin F/A-22 Raptor, Stealth Fighter. Aerofax, 2005. .

External links
 FB-22 Fighter Bomber page on GlobalSecurity.org
 "Doubts Surround Bomber's Future". Aviation Week, 24 February 2003.
 "Experimental technology could be applied to FB-22 bomber variant". Flight International, 25 May 2004.

FB-022
Cancelled military aircraft projects of the United States
Twinjets
Delta-wing aircraft
Stealth aircraft